Protea enervis, also known as the Chimanimani sugarbush, is a flowering shrub. It is native to the Chimanimani Mountains straddling Zimbabwe and Mozambique, and grows at altitudes of 1,680 to 2,000 metres.

The inflorescence is reddish-pink in colour.

Horticulture
It offers a reddish-pink flower head. It requires full sun to partial shade, and prefers a dry mesic climate. It performs best in moderately (5.6-6.0) or slightly acidic (6.1-6.5) soil.

References

enervis
Flora of Mozambique
Flora of Zimbabwe